Võsu is a small borough in Lääne-Viru County, in Haljala Parish, in Estonia. It was the administrative centre of Vihula Parish. As of 2011 Census, the settlement's population was 334.

In 1971–1999 Võsu was a borough, in 1992–1999 it had a municipality status.

References

External links

Vihula Parish 

Boroughs and small boroughs in Estonia
Former municipalities of Estonia
Kreis Wierland